Mexico competed at the 2020 Summer Olympics in Tokyo. Originally scheduled to take place from 24 July to 9 August 2020, the Games were postponed to 23 July to 8 August 2021, because of the COVID-19 pandemic. It was the nation's twenty-fourth appearance at the Summer Olympics. Athletes were given priority for vaccines in March.

Medalists

Competitors

The following is the list of number of competitors participating in the Games. Note that reserves in fencing, field hockey, football, and handball are not counted:

 162 athletes entries to competition, 1 athlete travel as reserve.

Archery

Mexican recurve team qualified for the women's team competition by securing one of three remaining spots available at the 2021 Archery Final Olympic Qualification Tournament in Paris, France. Another Mexican archer secured the last of three available spots with a bronze-medal victory in the men's individual recurve at the 2021 Pan American Qualification Tournament in Monterrey.

Artistic swimming

Mexico fielded a squad of two artistic swimmers to compete in the women's duet event by winning the silver medal at the 2019 Pan American Games in Lima, Peru.

Athletics

Mexican athletes further achieved the entry standards, either by qualifying time or by world ranking, in the following track and field events (up to a maximum of 3 athletes in each event):

Track & road events
Men

Women

Field events

Badminton

Mexico entered two badminton players (one per gender) into the Olympic tournament. Rio 2016 Olympian Lino Muñoz and debutant Haramara Gaitan were selected to compete in the men's and women's singles respectively based on the BWF World Race to Tokyo Rankings.

Baseball

Mexico national baseball team qualified for the first time at the Olympics by winning the bronze medal over the United States and securing an outright berth as the highest-ranked squad from the Americas at the 2019 WBSC Premier12 in Tokyo, Japan.

Summary

Team roster

Group play

Round 1

Boxing

Mexico entered three boxers (one male and two female) to compete in each of the following weight classes into the Olympic tournament. With the cancellation of the 2021 Pan American Qualification Tournament in Buenos Aires, Esmeralda Falcón finished among the top five of the women's lightweight category to secure her place in the Mexican squad based on the IOC's Boxing Task Force Rankings for the Americas. Rogelio Romero (men's light heavyweight) and Brianda Cruz (women's welterweight) completed the nation's sporting lineup by topping the field of boxers vying for qualification from the Americas in the same system.

Canoeing

Slalom
With the cancellation of the 2021 Pan American Championships, Mexico accepted the invitation from the ICF to send a canoeist in the men's slalom K-1 to the Games, as the highest-ranked eligible nation from the Americas in the federation's international rankings, marking the country's debut in the sporting discipline.

Cycling

Road
Mexico entered one rider each to compete in both men's and women's Olympic road race, by virtue of his top 50 national finish (for men) and her top 22 (for women), respectively, in the UCI World Ranking.

Track
Following the completion of the 2020 UCI Track Cycling World Championships, Mexican riders accumulated spots in the women's team sprint, as well as the women's sprint, and keirin based on their country's results in the final UCI Olympic rankings.

Sprint

Team sprint

Qualification legend: FA=Gold medal final; FB=Bronze medal final

Keirin

Mountain biking 
Mexican mountain bikers qualified for one men's and one women's quota place into the Olympic cross-country race, by topping the field of nations each vying for qualification at the 2019 Pan American Championships in Aguascalientes.

Diving

Mexican divers qualified for the following individual spots and synchronized teams at the Games through the 2019 FINA World Championships, the 2019 Pan American Games, and the 2021 FINA World Cup series in Tokyo, Japan.

Men

Women

Equestrian

Mexico fielded a squad of three equestrian riders into the Olympic team jumping competition by winning the silver medal and securing second of three available slots at the 2019 Pan American Games in Lima, Peru. MeanwhIle, one dressage rider was added to the Mexican roster by finishing in the top four, outside the group selection, of the individual FEI Olympic Rankings for Groups D and E (North, Central, and South America).

Dressage

Qualification Legend: Q = Qualified for the final; q = Qualified for the final as a lucky loser

Jumping

Fencing

Mexico entered one fencer into the Olympic competition. Diego Cervantes claimed a spot in the men's foil by winning the final match at the Pan American Zonal Qualifier in San José, Costa Rica.

Football

Summary

Men's tournament

Mexico men's football team qualified for the Olympics by advancing to the final match of the 2020 CONCACAF Men's Olympic Qualifying Championship.

Team roster

Group play

Quarterfinal

Semifinal

Bronze medal match

Golf

Mexico entered four golfers (two per gender) into the Olympic tournament. Abraham Ancer (world no. 23), Carlos Ortiz (world no. 53), Maria Fassi (world no. 180), and Gaby López (world no. 64) qualified directly among the top 60 eligible players for their respective events based on the IGF World Rankings.

Gymnastics

Artistic
Mexico entered two artistic gymnasts into the Olympic competition. Rio 2016 Olympians Daniel Corral and Alexa Moreno finished among the top twelve eligible for qualification in the men's and among the top twenty in the women's individual all-around and apparatus events, respectively, to book their spots on the Mexican roster at the 2019 World Championships in Stuttgart, Germany.

Men

Women

Rhythmic 
Mexico qualified one rhythmic gymnast for the individual all-around by winning the gold medal at the 2021 Pan American Championships in Rio de Janeiro, Brazil, marking the country's debut in this sporting discipline.

Trampoline 
Mexico entered one gymnast to compete in the women's trampoline by finishing among the top eight nations vying for qualification at the two-year-long World Cup Series.

Judo 
 
Mexico qualified one judoka for the women's half-middleweight category (63 kg) at the Games. Prisca Awiti accepted a continental berth from the Americas as the nation's top-ranked judoka outside of direct qualifying position in the IJF World Ranking List of June 28, 2021.

Modern pentathlon
 
Mexican athletes qualified for the following spots to compete in modern pentathlon. Mariana Arceo secured a selection in women's event with a gold medal victory at the 2019 Pan American Games in Lima. Mayan Oliver added another women's place on the Mexican squad by finishing among the top eight modern pentathletes vying for qualification in the UIPM World Rankings of 14 June 2021. On the men's side, Duilio Carrillo and Alvaro Sandoval received the spare berths unused at the 2021 Worlds and previously declined by Ireland's Arthur Lanigan O'Keeffe, as the next highest-ranked, eligible modern pentathletes in the same system.

Rowing

Mexico qualified one boat in the women's single sculls for the Games by winning the gold medal and securing the first of five berths available at the 2021 FISA Americas Olympic Qualification Regatta in Rio de Janeiro, Brazil.

Qualification Legend: FA=Final A (medal); FB=Final B (non-medal); FC=Final C (non-medal); FD=Final D (non-medal); FE=Final E (non-medal); FF=Final F (non-medal); SA/B=Semifinals A/B; SC/D=Semifinals C/D; SE/F=Semifinals E/F; QF=Quarterfinals; R=Repechage

Sailing

Mexican sailors qualified one boat in each of the following classes through the class-associated World Championships and the continental regattas.

M = Medal race; EL = Eliminated – did not advance into the medal race

Shooting

Mexican shooters achieved quota places for the following events by virtue of their best finishes at the 2018 ISSF World Championships, the 2019 ISSF World Cup series, the 2019 Pan American Games, and Championships of the Americas, as long as they obtained a minimum qualifying score (MQS) by 31 May 2020.

Softball

Mexico women's national softball team qualified for the Olympics by finishing in the top two of the WBSC Women's Softball Americas Qualification Event in Surrey, British Columbia, Canada.

Summary

Team roster

Group play

Bronze medal match

Swimming

Mexican swimmers further achieved qualifying standards in the following events (up to a maximum of 2 swimmers in each event at the Olympic Qualifying Time (OQT), and potentially 1 at the Olympic Selection Time (OST)):

Taekwondo

Mexico entered two athletes into the taekwondo competition at the Games. 2019 Pan American Games bronze medalist Carlos Sansores (men's +80 kg) and heavyweight champion Briseida Acosta (women's +67 kg) secured the spots on the Mexican squad with a top two finish each in their respective weight classes at the 2020 Pan American Qualification Tournament in San José, Costa Rica.

Tennis 

Mexico entered two tennis players into the Olympic tournament. Renata Zarazúa (world no. 137) qualified directly as one of the top 56 official entrants in the women's singles based on the WTA World Rankings of 14 June 2021. Moreover, she and her partner Giuliana Olmos opted to play in the women's doubles.

Triathlon

Mexico entered four triathletes (two per gender) to compete at the Olympics. Rio 2016 Olympians Irving Pérez and Cecilia Pérez, with Crisanto Grajales and Claudia Rivas going to their third consecutive Games, were selected among the top 26 triathletes vying for qualification in their respective events, including the inaugural mixed relay, based on the individual ITU World Rankings of 15 June 2021.

Individual

Relay

Volleyball

Beach
Mexico men's beach volleyball team qualified directly for the Olympics by winning the gold medal at the 2018–2020 NORCECA Continental Cup Final in Colima.

Weightlifting

Mexico entered four weightlifters (two per gender) into the Olympic competition. Ana Gabriela López (women's 55 kg) and Aremi Fuentes (women's 76 kg) secured one of the top eight slots each in their respective weight divisions based on the IWF Absolute World Rankings, with Jonathan Muñoz and Jorge Cárdenas (men's 73 kg) topping the field of weightlifters each vying for qualification from the Americas in the men's 67 and 73 kg category, respectively, based on the IWF Absolute Continental Rankings.

Wrestling

Mexico qualified two wrestlers for each of the following classes into the Olympic competition; all of whom advanced to the top two finals to book Olympic spots in the men's Greco-Roman 77 kg and women's freestyle 57 kg, respectively, at the 2020 Pan American Qualification Tournament in Ottawa, Canada.

Freestyle

Greco-Roman

See also
Mexico at the 2019 Pan American Games

References

Nations at the 2020 Summer Olympics
2020
2021 in Mexican sports